Migdal Afek, also Migdal Tsedek, is a national park on the southeastern edge of Rosh HaAyin, Israel. It is the site of the depopulated Palestinian village of Majdal Yaba.

History

Located in Migdal Afek are the ruins of Mirabel, a Crusader castle, built on the site of ancient Migdal Afek. It was described in Muslim sources in 1225 as a village with a fortress called Majdal Yaba. In the 17th century, the village was taken over by the Rayyān family who arrived from Transjordan and built a two-story manor house. The ruins of the manor house, among which remains of the Crusader castle can be seen, are today called Migdal Afek or Migdal Tsedek.

The village was depopulated by the IDF in July 1948.

Migdal Tsedek means "Tower of Sadek" in Hebrew, referring to the name of its Sheikh Sadek Al Rayyan.

A lintel over an entrance that was used by the local sheikh as a stable and fodder storage room bears the Greek inscription "Martyr Memorial Church of the Holy Herald."

During World War I, Migdal Afek was the site of battles between the Central Powers (forces of the Ottoman, German and Austro-Hungarian empires) and the Egyptian Expeditionary Force.

See also
Vassals of the Kingdom of Jerusalem 
National parks of Israel

References

National parks of Israel
Crusader castles
Castles and fortifications of the Kingdom of Jerusalem
Castles in Israel
Protected areas of Central District (Israel)
Buildings and structures in Central District (Israel)